This is an overview of the progression of the Olympic track cycling record of the women's 500 m time trial as recognised by the Union Cycliste Internationale (UCI).

The women's 500 m time trial was introduced at the 2000 Summer Olympics and was discontinued after the 2004 Summer Olympics.

Progression

References

Track cycling Olympic record progressions